The Chilean seaside cinclodes (Cinclodes nigrofumosus) is a species of bird in the family Furnariidae. It is endemic to rocky shorelines in Chile. Some authorities include the Peruvian seaside cinclodes as a subspecies while others list it as a separate species. The ranges of the two do not overlap.

Description
The upper parts are mainly a dark sooty brown, with a narrow whitish superciliary stripe and pale tips to the outer tail feathers. The wings have a rufous-buff bar that is chiefly visible in flight. The chin, throat and sides of the neck are white while the breast and belly are brown, streaked with white. The beak is charcoal grey and slightly curved and the rather short legs are dark grey.

Distribution and habitat
This bird is endemic to Chile where it lives on the coast, typically on rocky shores with boulders and tidepools. Its range extends from Arica to Valdivia.

Ecology
Chilean seaside cinclodes bob their tail as they walk. They have a loud trilling song, often uttered from the top of a boulder, and often flare their wings as they sing. They forage singly or in pairs, searching along the foreshore for the small crustaceans and other invertebrates on which they feed, often hunting in surf-exposed places. Breeding takes place in August and September. The nest is built in a rock crevice or in a hole excavated in an earth bank and is formed out of grasses, with two to four white eggs being laid.

Status
The Chilean seaside cinclodes has a very wide range and is described as common. The population trend seems to be steady, and the total population is large. No particular threats have been identified and the International Union for Conservation of Nature (IUCN) has assessed the bird's conservation status as being of "least concern".

References

Chilean seaside cinclodes
Birds of Chile
Endemic birds of Chile
Western South American coastal birds
Chilean seaside cinclodes
Taxa named by Alcide d'Orbigny
Taxa named by Frédéric de Lafresnaye
Taxonomy articles created by Polbot